Álvaro Santamaría may refer to:

 Álvaro Santamaría (footballer, born 1950), Colombian football forward
 Álvaro Santamaría (footballer, born 2001), Spanish football forward